Sean Patrick Murphy (born August 17, 1965) is an American professional golfer who has played on the PGA Tour and the Nationwide Tour.

Amateur career
Murphy was born in Des Moines, Iowa. His father got him started with golf at age 6. He was the New Mexico High School Champion in 1982 and 1984, and American Junior Golf Association Southwest Champion in 1983. He attended the University of New Mexico and was the Western Athletic Conference Player of the Year in 1988.

Professional career
Murphy turned professional in 1988. He was the first player to win on the Nike Tour (now the Web.com Tour) four times in one year. He shared the Web.com Tour record for most career victories at six with Kevin Johnson, Matt Gogel and Jason Gore, until Gore earned his seventh win in 2010. Murphy was the Nike Tour Player of the Year and money leader in 1993.

Murphy has more than $1 million in career earnings. He has played in five major championships: 1993 U.S. Open at Baltusrol, 1996 U.S. Open at Oakland Hills, 1996 Open Championship at Royal Lytham & St. Annes, 1997 U.S. Open at Congressional, and 2003 U.S. Open at Olympia Fields. His best finish in a major championship was T-32 at Oakland Hills.

Murphy lives in Scottsdale, Arizona.

Professional wins (6)

Nike Tour wins (6)

Nike Tour playoff record (1–2)

Results in major championships

CUT = missed the half-way cut
"T" = Tied
Note: Murphy never played in the Masters Tournament or the PGA Championship.

See also
1989 PGA Tour Qualifying School graduates
1990 PGA Tour Qualifying School graduates
1993 Nike Tour graduates
1995 Nike Tour graduates
1998 Nike Tour graduates
1999 PGA Tour Qualifying School graduates
2000 PGA Tour Qualifying School graduates
List of golfers with most Web.com Tour wins

References

External links

American male golfers
New Mexico Lobos men's golfers
PGA Tour golfers
Korn Ferry Tour graduates
Golfers from Iowa
Golfers from New Mexico
Golfers from Scottsdale, Arizona
Sportspeople from Des Moines, Iowa
1965 births
Living people